Fahrenheit 451 is a novel by Ray Bradbury.

Fahrenheit 451 may also refer to:

Fahrenheit 451 (1966 film), a 1966 film adaptation of the novel
Fahrenheit 451 (2018 film), a television adaptation of the novel
Fahrenheit 451 (video game), a 1984 computer game based on the novel
 "Fahrenheit 451", a song by ATB from Trilogy
 "Fahrenheit 451", a song by Hawkwind from Choose Your Masques
 "Fahrenheit 451", a song by Utopia from Swing to the Right
 "Fahrenheit 451", a song by Zaine Griff from Figvres
 "Fahrenheit 451", an episode of the anime series R.O.D the TV
Fahrenheit 451 Books, a former bookstore in Laguna Beach, California

See also 
 Fahrenheit (disambiguation)
 Centigrade 232, a poem by Robert Calvert
 Fahrenheit 9/11, a 2004 documentary film by Michael Moore
 Fahrenheit 11/9, a 2018 documentary film by Michael Moore
 HTTP 451, an error status code of the HTTP protocol meaning "Unavailable For Legal Reasons"